Off the Floor may refer to:

"Off the Floor", song by Guided by Voices from The Grand Hour 1993 EP 
"Off the Floor", song by Arcane Roots from Melancholia Hymns 2017